Taraba F.C. is a Nigerian football club based in Jalingo, Taraba. They played in the top-tier division in Nigerian football, the Nigeria Premier League after promotion in 2013 until a last place finish in 2015. Until 2007, they were based in Abuja and were named SEC (Securities & Exchange Commission) Football Club.

Current squad

References

External links
allAfrica.com: Nigeria: Abuja Loses Two Teams to New Owners
Babangida to transform Taraba FC

Football clubs in Nigeria
Taraba State
2007 establishments in Nigeria
Sports clubs in Nigeria
Association football clubs established in 2007